The 2005–06 season was FC Kremin Kremenchuk's 3rd overall and 1st consecutive season in the Second League.

Team kit
The team kits are produced by Puma AG and the shirt sponsor is KremenchukMiaso «Кременчукм’ясо». The home and away kit was retained from previous seasons.

Statistics

Top scorers
Includes all competitive matches. The list is sorted by shirt number when total goals are equal.

Last updated on 20 October 2009

Disciplinary record

Captains
Includes all competitive matches.

Last updated on 20 October 2009

Club

Coaching staff

Other information

Competitions

Overall

Ukrainian Second League

Kremin's third overall and first consecutive season in Druha Liha began on 6 August 2005 and ended on 24 June 2006.

Classification

Matches
All kickoff times are in EEST.

Ukrainian Cup

Preliminary round

Disciplinary record

References

External links
  FC Kremin Kremenchuk official website

FC Kremin Kremenchuk seasons
Kremin Kremenchuk